The great European immigration wave to Argentina took place in the late 19th and early 20th century. It consisted mostly of Italian and Spanish immigrants, along with other nationalities such as French, Slavs (especially Ukrainians, Poles, Russians and Croatians), Germans (many of whom were registered with other nationalities upon arrival in the country, for example as Russians, since most of them were ethnic Germans from different parts of Europe)Swedish, Danish and Welsh, among others, including Jews. During this period Argentina saw a huge increase in population. Some groups of European immigrants modified the politics of Argentina by introducing political movements from their source countries, such as labor unionism, anarchism and socialism.

Causes

Before the immigration, Argentina was sparsely populated. The Spanish colonization of the Americas favored Mexico and Peru, the southern Spanish regions had no sources of wealth and had lower populations. This population decreased even more in the 19th century, during the Argentine War of Independence and the Argentine Civil Wars. Several Argentines from that time period, such as Domingo Faustino Sarmiento and Juan Bautista Alberdi, thought that it was imperative to populate the country. The Constitution of Argentina of 1853 promoted European immigration in its 25th article, which prohibited any barriers on immigration.

As the immigration came from several European countries, there was no single reason that led to the immigrants leaving their home countries. Some of them simply sought a better lifestyle, but many others escaped from ongoing conflicts within Europe. Some Spanish and Italian immigrants had been part of the International Workingmen's Association, and some German immigrants had been removed from Germany by a decree of Otto von Bismarck that banned socialism in 1878. Spanish immigrants escaped from the Third Carlist War.

Impact of European immigration
European immigration produced a wide range of impacts. In the interior of the country, many towns flourished around the large expanses of land worked by European families. This fact, together with the liberal policies implemented by the Argentine State at the end of the 19th century and the beginning of the 20th century, allowed the country to become rich and prosper at the time. In fact, as a direct result, the country experienced the highest economic growth in its history.

Meanwhile, the city of Buenos Aires received many scientists and different professionals from Europe in the early years of these policies, who contributed to make the city even more sophisticated and made many luxury goods stores flourish. However, the totally unregulated immigration policy adopted by Argentina also allowed many European social agitators and terrorists of its time to settle in the country, and naturally they preferred to do it in the capital, where their field of action was greater, so far from the hard work in the countryside. In that very young Argentina, those would confirm that they could do what their countries of origin had not allowed them. One of those was the Italian Errico Malatesta, whose anti-government and revolutionary anarchist actions in Italy earned him a prison sentence. However, he fled Italy hidden in a container carrying a sewing machine and arrived in Argentina in 1885. In Buenos Aires, the fugitive quickly associated with other European anarchists who had already settled in the country, including his compatriot Ettore Mattei, who had just organized the trade union called Sociedad Cosmopolita de Resistencia y Colocación de Obreros Panaderos. Two years later, they had already organized a strike in Buenos Aires that kept the bakeries closed for more than a week. As part of their actions, the members of the union renamed their pastries (known as facturas) with nicknames that offended the government, the military and the Church, institutions that according to the anarchists restricted individual freedom. These names were widely spread and continue to be used today. In subsequent years, there were strikes in many industries in Argentina, from carpenters to mechanics and shoemakers, and the Italian fugitive Malatesta was at the forefront of the protests.

The small and inexperienced ruling class of Argentina had been confident that a policy of total deregulation regarding immigration would not have any negative impact in any way. However, in the later practice, this meant the end of the elegant and safe Buenos Aires that they had created, and the beginning of a political movement, composed precisely of European immigrants and descendants of European immigrants, that finally labeled the same ruling class that opened the doors to these immigrants as the enemy of the nation. Since then, in that new country, the ruling class of Argentina realized with belated astonishment that thanks to the progressive policies promoted by themselves, now their vote was worth as much as the vote of the newcomers. With the great difference that the recently arrived poors were many more than the rich ones who had opened the doors to them. This political movement developed over the decades and finally hatched just after World War II, agglutinating several of the political visions of the former agitators under the authoritarian form of populism.

In the following decades, inflammatory political speeches against the landowners and the former ruling class (branded as the oligarchy) have been a constant. Union obstructionism has led to the closure of many factories in the country. The impossibility of extorting the closed factories has intensified the fiscal and political pressure against the landowners. The high taxes levied on rural producers have caused a decline in rural exports such as soy, milk and meat, which has also translated into a decline in the country's GDP. Argentina is currently one of the countries with the largest number of weekly demonstrations and strikes, regardless of what economic stage the country is experiencing, and this is a legacy of those social agitators who were also allowed to settle and operate. These demonstrations are not spontaneous, but respond to the high degree of unionization in the country. This requires an important logistical movement, for instance, it is common to see a large number of union buses taking and bringing these protesters from the outskirts of Buenos Aires to the center of the capital (commonly, Plaza de Mayo or Congressional Plaza). In turn, these organizers also feed on the new poor immigrants, who in recent decades come no longer from Europe but from other countries of Latin America, on who they promote the same political practices brought by the European agitators of their time. In contrast, protests and pickets are very infrequent in cities and towns in the interior of the country; however, the protests in the city of Buenos Aires are widely covered by the local media, since their headquarters are in the country's capital. Different political initiatives, both de facto and democratic, have tried to counteract the populist movement, but the phenomenon has shown an inveterate vocation.

Origin of immigrants up to 1940 

Source: National Directorate of Migrations (DNM).

In other areas, European immigration has resulted in the great impact of Italian and Spanish gastronomy in the country, in French and Italian styles architecture, and in a very rich cultural activity.

With its pros and cons, the mass establishment of those millions of Europeans has deeply forged Argentina's identity.

See also 
 Argentines of European descent
 History of the Jews in Argentina

Notes

References

External links

 
Immigration to Argentina
History of Argentina (1880–1916)
Italian Argentine
Spanish Argentine